The kraft process (also known as kraft pulping or sulfate process) is a process for conversion of wood into wood pulp, which consists of almost pure cellulose fibres, the main component of paper. The kraft process involves treatment of wood chips with a hot mixture of water, sodium hydroxide (NaOH), and sodium sulfide (Na2S), known as white liquor, that breaks the bonds that link lignin, hemicellulose, and cellulose.  The technology entails several steps, both mechanical and chemical.  It is the dominant method for producing paper.  In some situations, the process has been controversial because kraft plants can release odorous products and in some situations produce substantial liquid wastes.

The process name is derived from German word Kraft, meaning "strength" in this context, due to the strength of the kraft paper produced using this process.

History

A precursor of the kraft process was used during the Napoleonic Wars in England. The kraft process was invented by Carl F. Dahl in 1879 in Danzig, Prussia, Germany.  was issued in 1884, and a pulp mill using this technology began in Sweden in 1890. The invention of the recovery boiler by G. H. Tomlinson in the early 1930s was a milestone in the advancement of the kraft process. It enabled the recovery and reuse of the inorganic pulping chemicals such that a kraft mill is a nearly closed-cycle process with respect to inorganic chemicals, apart from those used in the bleaching process. For this reason, in the 1940s, the kraft process superseded the sulfite process as the dominant method for producing wood pulp.

The process

Impregnation
The chips normally first enter the presteaming where they are wetted and preheated with steam. Cavities inside fresh wood chips are partly filled with liquid and partly with air. The steam treatment causes the air to expand and about 25% of the air to be expelled from the chips. The next step is to saturate the chips with black and white liquor. Air remaining in chips at the beginning of liquor impregnation is trapped within the chips. The impregnation can be done before or after the chips enter the digester and is normally done below . The cooking liquors consist of a mixture of white liquor, water in chips, condensed steam and weak black liquor. In the impregnation, cooking liquor penetrates into the capillary structure of the chips and low temperature chemical reactions with the wood begin. A good impregnation is important to get a homogeneous cook and low rejects. About 40–60% of all alkali consumption, in the continuous process, occurs in the impregnation zone.

Cooking
The wood chips are then cooked in pressurized digesters. Some digesters operate in a batch manner and some in a continuous process. Digesters producing 1,000 tonnes or more of pulp per day are common, with the largest producing more than 3,500 tonnes per day. Under digesting conditions, lignin and hemicellulose degrade to give fragments that are soluble in the strongly basic liquid. The solid pulp (about 50% by weight of the dry wood chips) is collected and washed. At this point the pulp is known as brown stock because of its color. The combined liquids, known as black liquor (because of its color), contain lignin fragments, carbohydrates from the breakdown of hemicellulose, sodium carbonate, sodium sulfate and other inorganic salts.

One of the main chemical reactions that underpin the kraft process is the scission of ether bonds by the nucleophilic sulfide (S2−) or bisulfide (HS−) ions.

Recovery process
The excess black liquor contains about 15% solids and is concentrated in a multiple effect evaporator. After the first step the black liquor has about 20–30% solids. At this concentration the rosin soap rises to the surface and is skimmed off. The collected soap is further processed to tall oil. Removal of the soap improves the evaporation operation of the later effects.

The weak black liquor is further evaporated to 65% or even 80% solids ("heavy black liquor") and burned in the recovery boiler to recover the inorganic chemicals for reuse in the pulping process. Higher solids in the concentrated black liquor increases the energy and chemical efficiency of the recovery cycle, but also gives higher viscosity and precipitation of solids (plugging and fouling of equipment). During combustion, sodium sulfate is reduced to sodium sulfide by the organic carbon in the mixture:

1. Na2SO4 + 2 C → Na2S + 2 CO2

This reaction is similar to thermochemical sulfate reduction in geochemistry.

The molten salts ("smelt") from the recovery boiler are dissolved in a process water known as "weak wash". This process water, also known as "weak white liquor" is composed of all liquors used to wash lime mud and green liquor precipitates. The resulting solution of sodium carbonate and sodium sulfide is known as "green liquor". The green liquor's eponymous green colour arises from the presence of colloidal iron sulfide. This liquid is then mixed with calcium oxide, which becomes calcium hydroxide in solution, to regenerate the white liquor used in the pulping process through an equilibrium reaction (Na2S is shown since it is part of the green liquor, but does not participate in the reaction):

2. Na2CO3 + Ca(OH)2 ←→ 2 NaOH + CaCO3

Calcium carbonate precipitates from the white liquor and is recovered and heated in a lime kiln where it is converted to calcium oxide (lime).

3. CaCO3 → CaO + CO2

Calcium oxide (lime) is reacted with water to regenerate the calcium hydroxide used in Reaction 2:

4. CaO + H2O → Ca(OH)2

The combination of reactions 1 through 4 form a closed cycle with respect to sodium, sulfur and calcium and is the main concept of the so-called recausticizing process where sodium carbonate is reacted to regenerate sodium hydroxide.

The recovery boiler also generates high pressure steam which is fed to turbogenerators, reducing the steam pressure for the mill use and generating electricity. A modern kraft pulp mill is more than self-sufficient in its electrical generation and normally will provide a net flow of energy which can be used by an associated paper mill or sold to neighboring industries or communities through to the local electrical grid. Additionally, bark and wood residues are often burned in a separate power boiler to generate steam.

Although recovery boilers using G.H. Tomlinson's invention have been in general use since the early 1930s, attempts have been made to find a more efficient process for the recovery of cooking chemicals. Weyerhaeuser has operated a Chemrec first generation black liquor entrained flow gasifier successfully at its New Bern plant in North Carolina, while a second generation plant is run in pilot scale at Smurfit Kappa's plant in Piteå, Sweden.

Blowing
The finished cooked wood chips are blown to a collection tank called a blow tank that operates at atmospheric pressure. This releases a lot of steam and volatiles. The volatiles are condensed and collected; in the case of northern softwoods this consists mainly of raw turpentine.

Screening
Screening of the pulp after pulping is a process whereby the pulp is separated from large shives, knots, dirt and other debris. The accept is the pulp. The material separated from the pulp is called reject.

The screening section consists of different types of sieves (screens) and centrifugal cleaning. The sieves are normally set up in a multistage cascade operation because considerable amounts of good fibres can go to the reject stream when trying to achieve maximum purity in the accept flow.

The fiber containing shives and knots are separated from the rest of the reject and reprocessed either in a refiner or is sent back to the digester. The content of knots is typically 0.5–3.0% of the digester output, while the shives content is about 0.1–1.0%.

Washing
The brownstock from the blowing goes to the washing stages where the used cooking liquors are separated from the cellulose fibers. Normally a pulp mill has 3-5 washing stages in series. Washing stages are also placed after oxygen delignification and between the bleaching stages as well. Pulp washers use countercurrent flow between the stages such that the pulp moves in the opposite direction to the flow of washing waters. Several processes are involved: thickening / dilution, displacement and diffusion. The dilution factor is the measure of the amount of water used in washing compared with the theoretical amount required to displace the liquor from the thickened pulp. Lower dilution factor reduces energy consumption, while higher dilution factor normally gives cleaner pulp. Thorough washing of the pulp reduces the chemical oxygen demand (COD).

Several types of washing equipment are in use:
 Pressure diffusers
 Atmospheric diffusers
 Vacuum drum washers
 Drum displacers
 Wash presses

Bleaching

In a modern mill, brownstock (cellulose fibers containing approximately 5% residual lignin) produced by the pulping is first washed to remove some of the dissolved organic material and then further delignified by a variety of bleaching stages.

In the case of a plant designed to produce pulp to make brown sack paper or linerboard for boxes and packaging, the pulp does not always need to be bleached to a high brightness. Bleaching decreases the mass of pulp produced by about 5%, decreases the strength of the fibers and adds to the cost of manufacture.

Process chemicals
Process chemicals are added to improve the production process:
 Impregnation aids. Surfactants may be used to improve impregnation of the wood chips with the cooking liquors.
 Anthraquinone is used as a digester additive. It works as a redox catalyst by oxidizing cellulose and reducing lignin. This protects the cellulose from degradation and makes the lignin more water-soluble.
 An emulsion breaker can be added in the soap separation to speed up and improve the separation of soap from the used cooking liquors by flocculation.
 Defoamers remove foam and speed up the production process. Drainage of washing equipment is improved and gives cleaner pulp.
 Dispersing agents, detackifiers and complexing agents keep the system cleaner and reduce the need for maintenance stops.
 Fixation agents fix finely dispersed potential deposits to the fibers and thereby transport them out of the process.

Comparison with other pulping processes
Pulp produced by the kraft process is stronger than that made by other pulping processes and maintains a high effective sulfur ratio (sulfidity), an important determiner of the strength of the paper. Acidic sulfite processes degrade cellulose more than the kraft process, which leads to weaker fibers. Kraft pulping removes most of the lignin present originally in the wood whereas mechanical pulping processes leave most of the lignin in the fibers. The hydrophobic nature of lignin interferes with the formation of the hydrogen bonds between cellulose (and hemicellulose) in the fibers needed for the strength of paper (strength refers to tensile strength and resistance to tearing).

Kraft pulp is darker than other wood pulps, but it can be bleached to make very white pulp. Fully bleached kraft pulp is used to make high-quality paper where strength, whiteness, and resistance to yellowing are important.

The kraft process can use a wider range of fiber sources than most other pulping processes. All types of wood, including very resinous types like southern pine, and non-wood species like bamboo and kenaf can be used in the kraft process.

Byproducts and emissions

The main byproducts of kraft pulping are crude sulfate turpentine and tall oil soap. The availability of these is strongly dependent on wood species, growth conditions, storage time of logs and chips, and the mill's process. Pines are the most extractive-rich woods. The raw turpentine is volatile and is distilled off the digester, while the raw soap is separated from the spent black liquor by decantation of the soap layer formed on top of the liquor storage tanks. From pines the average yield of turpentine is 5–10 kg/t pulp and of crude tall oil is 30–50 kg/t pulp.

Various byproducts containing hydrogen sulfide, methyl mercaptan, dimethyl sulfide, dimethyl disulfide, and other volatile sulfur compounds are the cause of the malodorous air emissions characteristic for pulp mills utilizing the kraft process. The sulfur dioxide emissions of kraft-pulp mills are much lower than those from sulfite mills. In the ambient air outside a typical modern kraft-pulp mill, the sulfur-dioxide odour is perceivable only during disturbance situations, for example when the mill is shut down for a maintenance break, or when an extended power outage occurs. Control of odours is achieved through the collection and burning of these odorous gases in the recovery boiler alongside the black liquor. In modern mills, where well-dried solids are burned in the recovery boiler, hardly any sulfur dioxide leaves the boiler. At high boiler temperatures, the sodium released from the black liquor droplets reacts with sulfur dioxide, thereby effectively scavenging it by forming odourless sodium sulfate crystals.
  
Pulp mills are almost always located near large bodies of water due to their substantial demand for water. Delignification of chemical pulps releases considerable amounts of organic material into the environment, particularly into rivers or lakes. The wastewater effluent can also be a major source of pollution, containing lignins from the trees, high biological oxygen demand (BOD) and dissolved organic carbon (DOC), along with alcohols, chlorates, heavy metals, and chelating agents. The process effluents can be treated in a biological effluent treatment plant, which can substantially reduce their toxicity.

See also

 H-factor
 Johan Richter – Inventor of the continuous process for digesting wood pulp
 Kappa number
 Kraft paper
 Organosolv
 Paper
 Paper chemicals
 Pulp mill
 Soda pulping
 Wood pulp

References

Further reading

External links

 Pulp and Paper Circle provides industry-related information (especially kraft mills) to pulp and paper engineers and technologists.
 US EPA article on kraft pulping
 Reference Document on Best Available Techniques in Pulp and Paper Industry by European Commission, 2001

Papermaking
Chemical processes
Pulp and paper industry
1879 in science
1879 in Germany